Antonio Ruiz Escaño (born 24 October 1951), known as El Niño Leone, is a Spanish former child actor and stuntman.

He is known for playing Fernando in For a Few Dollars More (1965), and Stevens's youngest son in The Good, the Bad and the Ugly (1966), both directed by Sergio Leone. He has worked with Yul Brynner, Anthony Quinn, Charles Bronson and Robert Mitchum.

In 2015 he attended the Almeria Western Film Festival. From 2016 and for the 50 anniversary of For a Few Dollars More, he directed a Spaghetti Western conference in Los Albaricoques, Níjar and recreated some scenes. He also recreated the scenes of The Good, the Bad and the Ugly in Cortijo del Fraile. It was attended by a hundred people. He was honoured in Sad Hill Cemetery.

Filmography
 For a Few Dollars More (1965) as Fernando
 Dollars for a Fast Gun (1966)
 The Good, the Bad and the Ugly (1966) as Stevens' Youngest Son
 A Bullet for the General (1967) as Chico – Young Mexican at Train Station
 The Long Duel (1967) as Munnu
 Un día después de agosto (1968) as Folkloric Group Member
 Villa Rides (1968) as Juan
 Llego, veo, disparo (1968) as Postbag Carrier
 Massacre Harbor (1968) as Arab boy

References

External links
 
 
 

1951 births
Spanish male child actors
Spanish male film actors
20th-century Spanish male actors
Male actors from Andalusia
Living people
Male Spaghetti Western actors